The Continuum Hypothesis is the 3rd full-length studio album released by the Melodic death/Black metal band Epoch of Unlight.  It is the first to feature new vocalist BJ Cook and new guitarist Josh Braddock.

Track listing
 "The Continuum Hypothesis" (4:44)
 "Under Starside Skies" (4:08)
 "Argentum Era Secui Duos" (5:37)
 "Cardinality" (3:32)
 "Highgate" (6:18)
 "The End of All" (6:07)
 "Broken Pendulum" (3:51)
 "Aberrant Shadows" (5:26)
 "Quicksilver to Ash" (5:02)
 "Denubrum" (4:17)
 "The Scarlet Thread" (4:09)

Personnel

Musicians
Tino LoSicco:  Drums
Joe Totty:  Bass
BJ Cook:  Vocals
Josh Braddock:  Guitars

Guest musicians
Erin Farley:  Backing Vocals on "Aberrant Shadows"

Production
Recorded at Blue Meanie Studios, New Jersey
Mixed and Mastered at Blue Meanie Studios, New Jersey
Produced by Erin Farley and Epoch of Unlight
Engineered and Mixed by Erin Farley
Assistant Engineer:  Jeff Cummings
Mix Assistant:  Coady Brown
Mastered by Tim Gilles
Artwork and Band Photography by Fumunda Design

2005 albums
Epoch of Unlight albums